"Love means never having to say you're sorry" is a catchphrase based on a line from the Erich Segal novel Love Story and was popularized by its 1970 film adaptation starring Ali MacGraw and Ryan O'Neal. The line is spoken twice in the film: once in the middle of the film, by Jennifer Cavalleri (MacGraw's character), when Oliver Barrett (O'Neal) apologizes to her for his anger; and as the last line of the film, by Oliver, when his father says "I'm sorry" after learning of Jennifer's death.  In the script, the line is phrased slightly differently: "Love means not ever having to say you're sorry."

The line proved memorable, and has been repeated in various contexts since.  In 2005, it was voted #13 in the American Film Institute's list AFI's 100 Years... 100 Movie Quotes. The band Sounds of Sunshine had a Top 40 hit in the United States with a song titled "Love Means You Never Have to Say You're Sorry" in 1971.  "Love means never having to say you're..." is the opening sentence in the popular song "Can't Help but Love You" by The Whispers, from their album named after the movie, issued in 1972.

The line has also been criticized or mocked for suggesting that apologies are unnecessary in a loving relationship.  Another character played by O'Neal disparages it in the 1972 screwball comedy What's Up, Doc?: in that film's final scene, Barbra Streisand's character says "Love means never having to say you're sorry." and bats her eyelashes, and O'Neal's character responds in a flat deadpan voice, "That's the dumbest thing I ever heard."

MacGraw disagrees with the line, calling it a "crock".

In popular culture
In the 34th episode of the second season of Small Wonder, entitled "You Gotta Have Heart", the little robot girl Vicki's parents explain love to her as "love means never having to say you're sorry."

In a 2004 episode of The Simpsons ("Catch 'Em If You Can"), the Simpson family watches the film, and Lisa retorts, "No, it doesn't!"  The line has also been parodied countless times, usually substituting another word or phrase for "love" and/or "you're sorry", especially the latter. The quote is also shown in the TV series Love Rain.

In the 1st issue of DC Comics character Harley Quinn's first ongoing series by Karl Kesel, Harley exclaims "When you gonna learn, puddin'--Love is never having to say you're sorry!" to the Joker when she decides to break up with him after she has had enough of his mistreatment and abuse.

On iZombie Season 2, Episode 19, titled "Salivation Army", Liv says, "A massive zombie outbreak means never having to say you're sorry."

On Weeds, Nancy Botwin, after the death of her drug dealer mentor, U-Turn, explains to the tattoo artist her reason for getting a U-Turn traffic sign tattoo is that "It just reminds me that Thug means never having to say you're sorry." When asked by the tattoo artist if she doesn't mean "love", Nancy replies, "Absolutely not. Love means you're constantly apologizing."

In the episode "Stop, In the Name of Love" of Family Matters, Waldo Faldo asks Laura Winslow out, and she accepts, much to Steve Urkel's dismay. Waldo then responds to Urkel saying, "I'm sorry, Steve. I know how you feel about Laura, but it's like they say in the movie Love Story, 'Love means never having to say, I'm sorry' Steve, but I'm taking your chick!"

In Dark Shadows, Johnny Depp's character Barnabas Collins tells a group of hippies, "I am reminded of a line from Erich Segal's Love Story: 'Love means never having to say you are sorry.'" "However, please know that it is with sincere regret...that I must now kill all of you."

On Why Women Kill, Season 1, Episode 1 is titled "Murder Means Never Having to Say You're Sorry".

References

External links

Quotations from film
English phrases
1970 neologisms